The Park School of Baltimore, known as Park, is a private, coeducational, non-sectarian, progressive day school for children in Pre-Kindergarten (age 4) through grade twelve. Park is located in Brooklandville, Maryland, near the city of Baltimore.

History 
Park was founded in 1912 as a private K-12 school based on the principles of progressive education developed by John Dewey and others.

The creation of the school was spurred by the firing of Baltimore City’s progressive Superintendent of Schools James Van Sickle by newly elected Mayor James H. Preston in 1911. At the time the city’s private schools had quotas severely restricting the number of Jewish students admitted, and so Park adopted a policy of accepting all religions.

Park opened its doors to 98 students on September 30, 1912, in a three-story townhouse in the Auchentoroly Terrace Historic District across from Druid Hill Park. It was advertised as “A Country School in the City.”

As the school grew, it moved to a group of buildings on  Liberty Heights Avenue in 1917.

In 1950, Park’s student council passed a resolution calling for the school to "accept any applicant for admission, regardless of race, color or creed." In June 1954, one month after U.S. Supreme Court's Brown v. Board of Education decision desegregating public schools, Park's Board of Trustees voted "to receive any applications from any family suitable in interest and ambition," becoming the first private school in the city to do so. Black students began attending Park in 1955.

In 1959, Park moved to its current 100-acre campus on Old Court Road in Baltimore County. The school has undergone multiple expansions in recent years. More recent renovations include a new wing for science, mathematics, and technology in 1997; an Athletic Center in 2001; and a new visual and dramatic arts wing in 2003.[

In 2018, the United States Equal Employment Opportunity Commission filed a lawsuit alleging that Park discriminated on the basis of gender in employment decisions it made about sports coaches. The EEOC alleged that Park School violated federal anti-discrimination laws when it told a male softball coach that "it would not renew his contract for the 2017 softball season because of its 'preference for female leadership.'" Park School settled the lawsuit in 2019 for $41,000.

Notable faculty and staff
Laura Amy Schlitz, librarian and storyteller; won the 2008 Newbery Medal for her children's book Good Masters! Sweet Ladies! Voices from a Medieval Village and the 2013 Newbery Honor for her children's novel Splendors and Glooms. Schlitz wrote the monologues in Good Masters! Sweet Ladies! for the 5th Grade curriculum. Her most recent book, Princess Cora and the Crocodile, published in 2017.

Notable alumni
Robert Austrian ('33) – developer of the pneumonia vaccine
Guy Blakeslee ('99) a.k.a. Entrance – musician currently signed to Tee Pee Records
Martha Clarke ('62) – theater director and choreographer, MacArthur Award recipient
 Josh Dibb ('96) a.k.a. Deakin, David Portner ('97) a.k.a. Avey Tare, and Brian Weitz ('97) a.k.a. Geologist – members of the experimental music group Animal Collective
Jane Frank ('37) (Jane Schenthal Frank) – painter, sculptor, mixed media artist, and textile artist (as a child, her name was Jane Babette Schenthal)
Alan Frank Guttmacher ('15) – obstetrician/gynecologist, served as President of Planned Parenthood
Adam Gidwitz ('00) – New York Times bestselling children's book author of A Tale Dark & Grimm (Dutton Penguin, 2010) and Newbery Honoree for The Inquisitor’s Tale (Dutton Penguin, 2016)
Lydia Kay Griggsby ('86) – Judge of the United States Court of Federal Claims and formerly Chief Counsel for Private and Information Policy for the Senate Judiciary Committee
Walt Handelsman ('75) – Pulitzer Prize-winning political cartoonist (1997 and 2007)
Ben Jacobs ('02) – journalist, political reporter for The Guardian
Amy Berman Jackson ('72) – United States district judge of the United States District Court for the District of Columbia
Penny Johnson Jerald ('78) – actress, appeared in Fox television show 24 as the president's wife, Sherry Palmer
Annie Karni ('00) – journalist, White House Correspondent for the New York Times
 Chris Keating ('00) and Anand Wilder ('00) – members of the experimental music group Yeasayer
Steve Krulevitz ('69) – professional tennis player, was ranked #42 in the world and a member of the Israeli Davis Cup team
Jeffrey Alfred Legum ('59) – President and CEO of The Park Circle Motor Company
Amanda Lipitz ('98) – Tony Award-winning Broadway producer; director and producer of award-winning documentary STEP
Matthew Porterfield ('95) – independent filmmaker; Hamilton (2006), Putty Hill (2011), and I Used to Be Darker (2013)
Tom Rothman ('72) – Chairman of Sony Pictures Entertainment's Motion Picture Group
Josh Tyrangiel ('90) – Executive Vice President, Vice Media/HBO
Matthew Weiner – creator of the AMC television drama Mad Men
Julius Westheimer ('29) – financial advisor, television, and radio personality
Edward Witten ('68) – mathematical physicist and one of the leading researchers in string theory

See also
Baltimore County
Educational progressivism

References

External links
Official website
Park School on Google Street View

1912 establishments in Maryland
Brooklandville, Maryland
Private schools in Baltimore County, Maryland
Private high schools in Maryland
German-Jewish culture in Maryland
Private middle schools in Maryland
Private elementary schools in Maryland